Mount Loomis is located on the border of Alberta and British Columbia on the Continental Divide. It was named in 1918 after Frederick Oscar Warren Loomis, a Canadian Army general who served in World War I.

See also
 List of peaks on the Alberta–British Columbia border

References

Two-thousanders of Alberta
Two-thousanders of British Columbia
Canadian Rockies